Tchien District is one of three districts located in Grand Gedeh County, Liberia.

Districts of Liberia
Grand Gedeh County